Maivia is a Samoan surname.  Notable people with the surname include:

Peter Maivia (1937–1982), Samoan professional wrestler, grandfather of Dwayne "The Rock" Johnson
Lia Maivia (1927–2008), Samoan professional wrestling promoter, wife of Peter Maivia

Samoan-language surnames